Söderhamns FF is a Swedish football club located in Söderhamn in Gävleborg County.

Background
Söderhamns Fotbollförening were founded on 28 January 1986.  The club was formed after the Söderhamns IF football section was closed down.

Since their foundation Söderhamns FF has participated mainly in the middle divisions of the Swedish football league system.  The club currently plays in Division 3 Södra Norrland which is the fifth tier of Swedish football. They play their home matches at the Hällåsens IP in Söderhamn. Their home venue was inaugurated on 25 July 1987.

Söderhamns FF are affiliated to Hälsinglands Fotbollförbund.

Recent history
In recent seasons Söderhamns FF have competed in the following divisions:

2016 – Division II, Norrland
2015 – Division II, Norrland
2014 – Division II, Norrland
2013 – Division III, Södra Norrland
2012 – Division IV, Hälsingland
2011 – Division III, Södra Norrland
2010 – Division III, Södra Norrland
2009 – Division II, Norra Svealand
2008 – Division II, Norra Svealand
2007 – Division III, Södra Norrland
2006 – Division III, Mellersta Norrland
2005 – Division III, Södra Norrland
2004 – Division III, Södra Norrland
2003 – Division III, Södra Norrland
2002 – Division II, Norrland
2001 – Division II, Norrland
2000 – Division III, Södra Norrland
1999 – Division II, Östra Svealand
1998 – Division II, Östra Svealand
1997 – Division III, Södra Norrland
1996 – Division III, Södra Norrland
1995 – Division IV, Hälsingland
1994 – Division III, Södra Norrland
1993 – Division III, Södra Norrland

Attendances

In recent seasons Söderhamns FF have had the following average attendances:

Current squad

Footnotes

External links
 Söderhamns FF – Official website

Sport in Söderhamn
Football clubs in Gävleborg County
Association football clubs established in 1986
1986 establishments in Sweden